Dregea arabica, synonyms including Marsdenia robusta, is a species of flowering plant in the family Apocynaceae, native to Socotra and mainland Yemen. It was first described by Joseph Decaisne in 1844.

Conservation
Marsdenia robusta was assessed as "vulnerable" in the 2004 IUCN Red List, where it is said to be native only to Socotra. , M. robusta was regarded by Plants of the World Online as a synonym of Dregea arabica, which is also found in mainland Yemen.

References

Asclepiadoideae
Flora of Socotra
Flora of Yemen
Plants described in 1844